Matthias Bachinger won the inaugural event by defeating Frederik Nielsen 6–3, 3–6, 6–1 in the final.

Seeds

Draw

Finals

Top half

Bottom half

References
 Main Draw
 Qualifying Draw

Aegon Pro-Series Loughborough - Singles
Sport in Loughborough
2010 Singles